Starfucker is the eponymous first studio album by the Portland-based indie rock band Starfucker, released on September 23, 2008 through Badman Recording Co.

Composition
Josiah Hughes of Exclaim! described Starfucker as a mixture of "laidback" pop music with "epic" electronic sounds.

Critical reception

Hughes was ecstatic towards the LP, calling it "a debut album that cannot be missed." He highlighted its "addictive pop hooks," "mature arrangements" and "pristine," "top-notch" production.

Track listing

References

2008 debut albums
STRFKR albums